Tapinoma arnoldi is a species of ant in the genus Tapinoma. Described by Forel in 1913, the species is endemic to Zimbabwe.

References

Endemic fauna of Zimbabwe
Tapinoma
Hymenoptera of Africa
Insects described in 1913